Arthur magazine was a bi-monthly periodical that was founded in October 2002, by publisher Laris Kreslins and editor Jay Babcock. It received favorable attention from other periodicals such as L.A. Weekly, Print, Punk Planet and Rolling Stone. Arthur featured photography and artwork from Spike Jonze, Art Spiegelman, Susannah Breslin, Gary Panter and Godspeed You! Black Emperor. Arthur's regular columnists included Byron Coley, Thurston Moore, Daniel Pinchbeck, Paul Cullum, Douglas Rushkoff, and T-Model Ford. Some of the magazine's influences included Joan Didion, Thomas Paine, William Blake, Lester Bangs, Hunter S. Thompson, Tom Wolfe, and Greil Marcus, as well and the exhibit and book A Secret Location on the Lower East Side: Adventures in Writing, 1960-1980.

Arthur magazine was particularly drawn to noise music, stoner metal, folk and other types of psychedelia. The first issue of Arthur featured an interview with journalist and author Daniel Pinchbeck (author of Breaking Open the Head); artwork by Alan Moore (Watchmen, From Hell, League of Extraordinary Gentlemen); and an interview with Arthur C. Clarke.

Previous to creating the publication, Laris Kreslins created the popular music journals Sound Collector and Audio Review. Jay Babcock was a contributor to Mojo magazine and the L.A. Weekly.

Arthur magazine also released CDs and DVDs under the imprint of their label. On Labor Day weekend in 2005, they curated Arthurfest in Barnsdall Park; in February 2006, Arthur Ball in Echo Park; and in October 2006 Arthur Nights at The Palace Theater, in downtown Los Angeles.

On February 25, 2007, it was announced on the magazine's web site that it would be ceasing publication indefinitely. The hiatus was due to a breakdown in negotiations between Lime Publishing (Arthurs original publisher) and another unnamed publisher. In April 2007, it was announced that the magazine would return as Arthur Vol. II in the near future. The magazine resumed publication in September 2007.

In June 2008, owner Jay Babcock moved Arthur's headquarters from Los Angeles to New York, the seat of North America's publishing industry.

On March 6, 2011, Jay Babcock announced that the magazine would cease to exist in any form as of March 15, 2011, though its archive and store would remain active for an unspecified period thereafter.

In November 2012, the Arthur website announced the return of the magazine as of December 22, 2012. However, this resurgence proved to be brief, and in March 2014 the magazine once again announced that its online and print versions would go dormant.

As of April 20, 2017, Jay Babcock announced the start of Landline bulletin, a continuation of Arthur Magazine email bulletin. As Babcock describes it, "What is this stuff? Ideas and nudges, hopefully forming a small bailiwick outside the unceasing current of cruddiness — irregular epistles intended for friends, colleagues, Arthur heads, pastoral people, plant people, rural country people, dharma people, herbalists, gardeners, wild people and other curious sweetfolk."

References

External links

The Meter - article about Arthur magazine
Arthur Nights Forum

2002 establishments in California
2014 disestablishments in California
Bimonthly magazines published in the United States
Defunct magazines published in the United States
Magazines established in 2002
Magazines disestablished in 2014
Magazines published in California
Music magazines published in the United States